First Christian Church can refer to any number of local congregations. The name is most frequently associated with congregations of either the Christian Church (Disciples of Christ) or the Independent Christian Churches and Churches of Christ. The name is also used by congregations affiliated with other groups.

First Christian Church, or variations, may refer to the following churches in the United States:

(by state then city)
 First Christian Church Education Building, Birmingham, Alabama, listed on the National Register of Historic Places (NRHP) in Jefferson County, Alabama
 First Christian Church (Phoenix, Arizona), based on an unbuilt Frank Lloyd Wright plan
 First Christian Church (Tucson, Arizona), designed by Arthur T. Brown
 First Christian Church (Lonoke, Arkansas), listed on the NRHP in Lonoke County, Arkansas
 First Christian Church (Nashville, Arkansas), listed on the NRHP in Howard County, Arkansas
 First Christian Church (Paris, Arkansas), listed on the NRHP in Logan County, Arkansas
 First Christian Church (Russellville, Arkansas), listed on the NRHP in Pope County, Arkansas
 First Christian Church of Rialto, California, listed on the NRHP in San Bernardino County, California
 First Christian Church (Boulder, Colorado), received landmark designation by Boulder, Colorado, City Council ordinance on June 5, 2012
 First Christian Church (Trinidad, Colorado), listed on the NRHP in Animas County, Colorado
 First Christian Church (Pensacola, Florida), listed on the NRHP in Escambia County, Florida
 First Christian Church (Lewiston, Idaho), listed on the NRHP in Nez Perce County, Idaho
 First Christian Church (Columbus, Indiana), a U.S. National Historic Landmark and listed on the NRHP in Bartholomew County, Indiana
 First Christian Church (Wabash, Indiana), listed on the NRHP in Wabash County, Indiana
 First Christian Church (Pella, Iowa), listed on the NRHP in Marion County, Iowa
 First Christian Church (Ashland, Kentucky), listed on the NRHP in Boyd County, Kentucky (as First Christian Church of Ashland)
 First Christian Church (Corbin, Kentucky), listed on the NRHP in Whitley County, Kentucky
 First Christian Church (Junction City, Kentucky), listed on the NRHP in Boyle County, Kentucky
 First Christian Church (Louisville, Kentucky), listed on the NRHP in Jefferson County, Kentucky
 First Christian Church (Murray, Kentucky), listed on the NRHP in Calloway County, Kentucky
 First Christian Church (Columbia, Missouri), listed on the NRHP in Boone County, Missouri
 First Christian Church (Sweet Springs, Missouri), listed on the NRHP in Saline County, Missouri
 First Christian Church of Burlington, North Carolina, listed on the NRHP in Alamance County, North Carolina
 First Christian Church (Robersonville, North Carolina), listed on the NRHP in Martin County, North Carolina
 First Christian Church (Lawton, Oklahoma), listed on the NRHP in Comanche County, Oklahoma
 First Christian Church (Oklahoma City, Oklahoma), listed on the NRHP in Oklahoma County, Oklahoma
 First Christian Church Historic District, Oklahoma City, Oklahoma, listed on the NRHP in Oklahoma County, Oklahoma
 First Christian Church (Gleason, Tennessee), listed on the NRHP in Weakley County, Tennessee
 First Christian Church Parsonage, Belton 	Texas, listed on the NRHP in Bell County, Texas
 First Christian Church (Fort Worth, Texas), listed on the NRHP in Tarrant County, Texas
 First Christian Church (Longview, Washington), listed on the NRHP in Cowlitz County, Washington

See also
 Christian Church (Disciples of Christ)
 Christian churches and churches of Christ, part of the Restoration Movement
 National City Christian Church, Washington, DC